Pantáta Bezoušek is a 1941 Czechoslovak film. The film starred Josef Kemr.

References

External links
 

1941 films
1940s Czech-language films
Czechoslovak black-and-white films
Czechoslovak comedy films
1941 comedy films
1940s Czech films